Mitchell van Bergen (born 27 August 1999) is a Dutch professional footballer who plays as a winger for Ligue 1 club Reims.

Club career

Vitesse
In July 2015, Van Bergen joined Vitesse on a three–year deal from Eredivisie side Willem II as a fifteen-year old. On 18 December 2015, he made his professional senior debut in a 5–1 victory over Twente coming on as an 83rd-minute substitute for Milot Rashica after impressing in the Vitesse youth sides.

Ahead of the 2016–17 campaign, Van Bergen was promoted to the Vitesse first-team along with several other academy team-mates including Arshak Koryan, Thomas Oude Kotte, Zhang Yuning, Jeroen Houwen and Julian Lelieveld. Along with his promotion, he was reassigned the number 16, after holding the number 42 last season. On 6 August 2016, the opening day of the season, Van Bergen was given his first professional start under new manager Henk Fraser against his former club Willem II, playing 81 minutes before being replaced by debutant Koryan. On 27 January 2017, he signed a new three-and-a-half-year deal with Vitesse until 2020.

Heerenveen
On 31 August 2018, following limited first-team opportunities at Vitesse, Van Bergen joined fellow Eredivisie side, Heerenveen on a four-year deal for an undisclosed fee. He made his Heerenveen debut on 1 September 2018 replacing Michel Vlap in the 75th minute in a 1–1 draw against VVV-Venlo. He made his first start for the club in a 3–3 draw away at Excelsior playing 66 minutes before being replaced by Jizz Hornkamp. On 8 December 2018, he scored his first goals in the Eredivisie scoring the 4–1 and 5–1 in a 5–1 victory away at Willem II.

Reims
On 27 August 2021 he joined French Ligue 1 club Reims.

International career
On 9 September 2015, van Bergen made his Netherlands U17s debut in a 2–1 defeat against Israel U17s, in which he replaced Ché Nunnely in the 60th minute. Van Bergen made his Netherlands U21s debut on 31 May 2019, in a 5-1 victory over Mexico U21s, replacing Calvin Stengs in the 61st minute.

Career statistics

Honours
Vitesse
 KNVB Cup: 2016–17

References

External links
 

1999 births
Living people
Sportspeople from Oss
Association football forwards
Dutch footballers
Netherlands youth international footballers
Netherlands under-21 international footballers
SBV Vitesse players
SC Heerenveen players
Stade de Reims players
Eredivisie players
Ligue 1 players
Dutch expatriate footballers
Expatriate footballers in France
Dutch expatriate sportspeople in France
Footballers from North Brabant
21st-century Dutch people